Mellor v Spateman (1669) 1 Wm. Saund. 339, is an English common law trespass case heard in the Court of King's Bench where it was held that a corporation may prescribe to have a common of pasture. In relation to cattle levant and couchant within the town, a corporation may prescribe for common in gross, but not for common in gross without number.

Background 
The case concerned a claim of trespass by Henry Mellor against John Spateman on a common field of some 20 acres in Derby, called Littlefield. It was claimed that the defendant forcibly entered the close and allowed horses, bulls, swine and sheep to consume and tread down the grass.

The defendant pleaded not guilty to trespass with his cattle, but to the count of trespass with his two geldings and two mares, Mellor declared to the court that he was a burgess of the ancient borough of Derby at the time of the alleged trespass and for some time before, and due to an earlier change of name of the corporation to the name of mayor and burgesses, the defendant laid a prescription for common in the corporation. In particular, the defendant relied on said corporation being permitted to have other names, such as "bailiffs" and "burgesses", which extended the right to graze commonable cattle in the pasture at Littlefield. A change of name, or alteration, did not mean that a corporation would necessarily lose its franchises.

The question was raised as to whether cattle which did not belong to the corporation could feed on the common and consume the fruit of the land - in this case, the grass. It had long been established that the right to have an unlimited number of livestock grazing in a pasture would usurp the land, so a cap on the number of animals which could be supported throughout the winter was imposed.

Judgment 
The court found for the plaintiff because the defendant's plea was deemed to be bad for having omitted the words "levant and couchant within the town". Kelynge, C.J., stated that the common had not been destroyed and the judgment against the defendant was solely as a result of the fault in the plea.

Another outcome of the case was that a profit à prendre could only be created by grant or prescription. A distinction was drawn between an "easement", such as the custom of people drawing water from a well or spring, and a profit à prendre. Since an "easement" would not have been capable of giving rise to a profit à prendre, the right could only have been supported by a "grant in gross" or prescription. For a profit à prendre to be created in common law by prescription, it is necessary to demonstrate to the court that the "profit" had been in continuous use since time immemorial.

Kelynge, C.J., held that there could not be any common in gross without number. For cattle to be deemed levant and couchant in the town, there could not be "any common in gross without number"  and the court felt that the plea should not have omitted the wording "levant et couchant within the town".

As part of the judgment, the King's Bench recorded that: "The plaintiff must not only allege that he has a right of common for cattle levant and couchant, but must also prove it, by shewing himself in possession of some land, whereon the cattle may be levant and couchant." Levancy and couchancy was taken as the right of common for commonable cattle, where the possession of such land rested on it being capable of sustaining the 'commoned' livestock throughout the winter. The right of common had to be regulated by levancy and couchancy within the town, otherwise the corporation would in effect 'surcharge the common'.

Notes

References 

Court of King's Bench (England) cases
1669 in law
1669 in England
English trespass case law